Sound chips come in different forms and use a variety of techniques to generate audio signals. This is a list of sound chips that were produced by a certain company or manufacturer, categorized by the sound generation of the chips.

Programmable sound generators (PSG)

Wavetable synthesis

Frequency modulation (FM) synthesis

Pulse-code modulation (PCM) sampling

See also
List of sound card standards
List of Yamaha sound chips
Sound recording and reproduction

References

External links
Sound generators of the 1980s home computers - Has a list of chips, pictures, datasheets, etc.

 
Video game music technology